University of Veterinary Medicine Budapest is a state-owned university in Budapest, Hungary.

Past and present of the University of Veterinary Medicine Budapest 
The predecessor of the University of Veterinary Medicine Budapest (UVMB) was established as a department of the Faculty of Medicine of the University of Pest in 1787. The development of the national public veterinary services in the 19th century and the establishment of the provincial and district level veterinary offices resulted in a growing need for trained veterinary professionals, capable of demonstrating both theoretical and practical competence. This triggered an intensive development of the institution, including structural, educational and infrastructure development. From 1851 UVMB became an independent educational and research institution (initially called as Imperial-Royal Veterinary Institution of Pest, later Hungarian Royal Veterinary Institution ) specializing in training of veterinarians, providing diagnostic and health care services and providing support for the work of the governmetal veterinary offices. The opening of the current main campus of UVMB in the heart of Budapest also dates back to this period (1881).

Besides classical veterinary disciplines, UVMB also offers BSc and MSc in Biology and MSc in Zoology Research. In recent years Veterinary Public Health also become a prioritised field in the education and research, covering food hygiene, food safety risk analysis and food waste reduction.

Training in UVMB is available in three languages: English, German and Hungarian for students coming from about 60 countries of the world.

UVMB has been accredited by the European Association of Establishments for Veterinary Education (EAEVE).

Educational and research units 
Current educational and research units of UVMB:

 Animal Breeding, Nutrition and Laboratory Animal Science Department
 Center for Animal Welfare
 Centre for Bioinformatics
 Department and Clinic of Equine Medicine
 Department and Clinic of Internal Medicine
 Department and Clinic of Surgery and Ophthalmology
 Department of Anatomy and Histology
 Department of Animal Breeding and Genetics
 Department of Animal Hygiene, Herd Health and Mobile Clinic
 Department of Biostatistics
 Department of Botany
 Department of Chemistry
 Department of Clinical Pathology and Oncology
 Department of Ecology
 Department of Exotic Animal and Wildlife Medicine
 Department of Food Hygiene
 Department of Foreign Languages
 Department of Microbiology and Infectious Diseases
 Department of Obstetrics and Food Animal Medicine Clinic
 Department of Parasitology and Zoology
 Department of Pathology
 Department of Pharmacology and Toxicology
 Department of Physical Education
 Department of Physiology and Biochemistry
 Department of Veterinary Forensics and Economics
 Digital Food Chain Education, Research, Development and Innovation Institute
 Division of Immunoendocrinology and Radioisotopes
 Doctoral School of Veterinary Sciences
 Experimental Farm
 Institute for Biology

Rectors of UVMB since 1899 
 Ferenc Hutÿra (1899-1931)
 Ágoston Zimmermann (1939-1940)
 Rezső Manninger (1947-1948)
 Gyula Sályi (1958-1963)
 Jenő Kovács (1963-1966)
 András B. Kovács (1966-1972)
 Ferenc Kovács (1973-1978, 1983–1990)
 László Várnagy (1978-1981)
 Péter Tamás Sótonyi (2017–present)

Notable alumni
 Tolnay Sándor (1747–1818)
 Zlamál Vilmos (1803–1886)
 Szabó Alajos (1818–1904)
 Thanhoffer Lajos (1843–1909)
 Klug Nándor (1845–1909)
 Azary Ákos (1850–1888)
 Preisz Hugó (1860–1940)
 Hutÿra Ferenc (1860–1934)
 Magyary-Kossa Gyula (1865–1944)
 Korányi Sándor (1866–1944)
 Marek József (1868–1952)
 Aujeszky Aladár (1869–1933)
 Mócsy János (1895–1976)
 Bartha Adorján (1923–1996)
 Kovács Ferenc (1921–2015)
 Haraszti János (1924–2007)
 Pethes György (1926–2008)
 Mészáros János (1927–2018)
 Kutas Ferenc (1931)
 Simon Ferenc (1934)
 Rafai Pál (1940)
 Varga János (1941)
 Solti László (1946)
 Imre Kacskovics

References

External links
 University of Veterinary Medicine of Budapest

Universities in Budapest
Educational institutions established in 1787
1787 establishments in the Habsburg monarchy
Veterinary schools in Hungary